Wu Liuxi (born December 16, 1984) is a Chinese sport shooter. Born in Weinan, Shaanxi, she competed in the 2004 and 2008 Summer Olympics.

Career
Wu Liuxi was selected for the Shaanxi Provincial Shooting Team when she was only 20 years old. She became known when she outperformed Zhao Yinghui and Du Li and tied the world record in women's air rifle with 400 points at the Fifth National Intercity Games. She was recruited for the national shooting team soon after that.

Wu is known for her calmness, composure, and excellent emotional control.

Major achievements
 1995: Shaanxi Youth Sports Meet: First, women's 3*10 Shots Prone and 3*30 Shots Prone
 1998: Shanxi 11th Sports Meet: First, women's air rifle, 386 points, national record
 2002: National Championship Series (4th station): Second, women's 3*20
 2003: National Championship Series (3rd station): First, women's air rifle
 2003: Fifth National Intercity Games: First, women's air rifle
 2003: National Championship Series (4th station): First, women's 3*20
 2004: Malaysia Asian Championships: Third, women's air rifle

Olympic results

World records

References

External links
 profile
 

1984 births
Living people
Chinese female sport shooters
ISSF rifle shooters
Olympic shooters of China
People from Weinan
Shooters at the 2004 Summer Olympics
Shooters at the 2008 Summer Olympics
World record holders in shooting
Asian Games medalists in shooting
Sport shooters from Shaanxi
Shooters at the 2006 Asian Games
Shooters at the 2010 Asian Games
Shooters at the 2014 Asian Games
Asian Games gold medalists for China
Asian Games silver medalists for China
Asian Games bronze medalists for China
Medalists at the 2006 Asian Games
Medalists at the 2010 Asian Games
Medalists at the 2014 Asian Games